McDonogh School is a private, coeducational, PK-12, college-preparatory school founded in Owings Mills, Maryland, United States in 1873. The school is named after John McDonogh, whose estate originally funded the school. The school now enrolls approximately 1,300 students, between 90 and 100 of whom participate in the Upper School's five-day boarding program. McDonogh employs approximately 177 full-time faculty members, more than 80% of whom hold advanced degrees and 20% of whom live on-campus.

McDonogh is regarded as one of the Baltimore region's most prestigious preparatory schools and has been called a "Power School" by Baltimore magazine. The school's students frequently matriculate to Ivy League and other top-ranked colleges and universities. McDonogh's athletic programs have also seen widespread success, particularly in lacrosse, soccer, wrestling, and football, where the school's teams have been nationally ranked in recent years.

The school is a member of the Association of Independent Maryland Schools.

History
The school was established outside of Baltimore, Maryland in 1873 and funded by the estate of John McDonogh (1779 - 1850), a former Baltimore resident and slave-owner. The McDonogh campus encompasses 800 acres of land and houses more than 15 educational buildings including a new home for the middle school, The Marlene and Stewart Greenebaum Building. 

McDonogh was established as a semi-military school for orphan boys, who worked on the farm in exchange for their tuition, room, and board. Paying students arrived in 1922, and day students in 1927. The first African-American student was admitted in 1959, eight years after Brown v. Board of Education outlawed school segregation.  In 1971, the military traditions of the school were discontinued. The school became coeducational in 1975. McDonogh School's annual tuition ranges from $19,900 for Pre-Kindergarten students up to $46,600 for students of the Upper School. Full and partial McDonogh scholarships continue to this day, with $6.1 million in need-based aid awarded in the 2019-2020 school year.

David J. Farace, the present head of school, is the 13th person to hold this position. He assumed the position in 2018, succeeding Charles W. Britton.

Academics
The Upper School offers a college preparatory curriculum that includes courses in English, foreign language, history, mathematics, science, visual and performing arts, and physical education. Honors or Advanced Placement courses are available in all academic departments. Upper School students must also complete a community service requirement. All students perform an academic project independently or in small groups during the final three weeks of their senior year.

Academic and personal integrity is emphasized in the Upper School's Honor Code, which is enforced by a student-run Honor Council. The Honor Code reads:

The academic calendar at McDonogh follows a trimester system.

Roots Farm 
At McDonogh, the Roots Farm performs humanitarian work by growing vegetables and then donating them to local charity organizations.

The farm has so far donated 2,064 pounds of produce to charity organizations, and has benefited from 2,850 student service hours.

Notable alumni 

David Adkins, actor and playwright
Grant Aleksander (1978), actor and director 
John R. Bolton (1966), National Security Advisor of the United States
Edward Marshall Boehm (1929), sculptor
Wallace E. Boston, Jr., president and chief executive officer, American Public University System
Luke Broadwater (1998), journalist, Pulitzer Prize and George Polk Award winner
Henry G. Chiles, Jr. (1956), former commander-in-chief of the United States Strategic Command
Alexandra Bokyun Chun (1985), actress
Ken Cloude, former professional baseball pitcher for the Seattle Mariners
Jazwyn Cowan, professional basketball player.
Taylor Cummings (2012), women’s field lacrosse player for the University of Maryland, first person to win the Tewaaraton Award three times
Bruce Davidson (1968), world champion equestrian, Olympic gold medalist
 W. Timothy Finan, Maryland state delegate and judge
Henry Gantt (1878), mechanical engineer and management consultant, most famous for developing the Gantt chart in the 1910s
Darrius Heyward-Bey (2005), 7th pick of 2009 NFL draft and former University of Maryland wide receiver, current NFL wide receiver for the Pittsburgh Steelers 
Louis Hyman (1995), economic historian
Eric King (2000), defensive back for the Buffalo Bills and Tennessee Titans
Kayel Locke, professional basketball player.
Myles Martin (2015), freestyle and collegiate wrestler, NCAA champion
James McDaniel (1976), actor, played Lt. Fancy on NYPD Blue
Ben Queen (1992), screenwriter, television producer, wrote Disney/Pixar's Cars 2 and Cars 3
Pam Shriver (1979), former professional tennis player and current sports broadcaster
Frederic N. Smalkin (1964), Maryland's Chief Federal District Judge and brigadier general
DaJuan Summers (2006), former Georgetown University basketball player, drafted by the Detroit Pistons in the 2009 NBA Draft
Evan Taubenfeld (2001), Sire/Warner Bros. recording artist, EMI professional pop staff songwriter; Avril Lavigne's lead guitarist from spring 2002 to September 2004
Joseph D. Tydings (1946), former senator for Maryland, 1965–1971
Jenn Wasner (2004), indie rock musician
Josh Woods (2014), professional football player for the Chicago Bears

References

External links 
 

Preparatory schools in Maryland
Private schools in Baltimore County, Maryland
Private K-12 schools in Maryland
Owings Mills, Maryland
Educational institutions established in 1873
1873 establishments in Maryland